Robert Slater was an English international lawn bowls player who competed in the 1934 British Empire Games.

Bowls career
At the 1934 British Empire Games he won the gold medal in the rinks/fours event with Ernie Gudgeon, Percy Tomlinson and Fred Biggin.

He was the 1933 and 1934 pairs champion with Billy Buckell at the National Championships representing Callenders Bowling Club, Kent  and was also twice Kent County champion.

References

English male bowls players
Bowls players at the 1934 British Empire Games
Commonwealth Games gold medallists for England
Commonwealth Games medallists in lawn bowls
Medallists at the 1934 British Empire Games